Waleed Salem is a given name. Notable people with the name include:

 Waleed Salem Sulaiman (born 1980), Emirati footballer
 Waleed Salem Al-Lami (born 1992), Iraqi footballer

Compound given names